Mora is an unincorporated community in northern Benton County, Missouri, United States. It is located on Missouri Supplemental Route U approximately sixteen miles south of Sedalia.

Mora was laid out in 1882, when the railroad was extended to that point.  A post office has been in operation at Mora since 1882.

Mora is the birthplace of country music singer Leroy Van Dyke. Stan Kroenke, sports team owner, grew up in Mora and attended schools in Cole Camp.

References

Unincorporated communities in Benton County, Missouri
Unincorporated communities in Missouri